Sukad-Amba is a village in the Palghar district of Maharashtra, India. It is located in the Dahanu taluka.

Demographics 

According to the 2011 census of India, Sukad-Amba has 367 households. The effective literacy rate (i.e. the literacy rate of population excluding children aged 6 and below) is 21.77%.

References 

Villages in Dahanu taluka